Suck-egg Hollow is a valley in Roane County, Tennessee, in the United States.

Suck-egg Hollow was named from an incident when a snake was found eating the chicken eggs of a local farmer.

References

Landforms of Roane County, Tennessee
Valleys of Tennessee